KKMS may refer to:

 Knaster–Kuratowski–Mazurkiewicz lemma#The KKMS theorem, in mathematics and economics
 KKMS (AM), a radio station (980 AM) licensed to serve Richfield, Minnesota, United States
 The Kidd Kraddick Morning Show, an American syndicated morning radio show.